Marv Skie–Lincoln County Airport  is a public use airport in Lincoln County, South Dakota, United States. It is owned by Lincoln County and located two nautical miles (4 km) northeast of the central business district of Tea, South Dakota. This airport is included in the National Plan of Integrated Airport Systems for 2011–2015, which categorized it as a general aviation facility.

Background 

The airport was named for Marvin A. Skie (1914–1997) of Lennox, Lincoln County.

Facilities and aircraft 
Marv Skie–Lincoln County Airport covers an area of 134 acres (54 ha) at an elevation of 1,515 feet (462 m) above mean sea level. It has one runway designated 16/34 with a concrete surface measuring 3,650 by 60 feet (1,113 x 18 m).

For the 12-month period ending September 28, 2011, the airport had 40,860 aircraft operations, an average of 111 per day: 99% general aviation and 1% air taxi. At that time there were 89 aircraft based at this airport: 98% single-engine and 2% multi-engine.

See also 
 List of airports in South Dakota

References

External links 
 Airport page at Lincoln County website
 Aerial image as of October 1997 from USGS The National Map
 

Airports in South Dakota
Buildings and structures in Lincoln County, South Dakota
Transportation in Lincoln County, South Dakota